Little Oakley is a village in Essex, England, on the western outskirts of Harwich.  The parish population at the 2011 census was 1,171.

It is the site of a fourth-century Roman villa, excavated between 1951 and 1975.

Just north-east of the village is Little Oakley Channel Deposit, a geological Site of Special Scientific Interest.  It is the site of former channel of the River Thames during an interglacial period about 575,000 years ago.

References

External links

 Little Oakley Parish Council
 

Villages in Essex
Tendring